Irugur Junction (code: IGU) is a railway station in Irugur, Coimbatore, Tamil Nadu, India.

The station has two platforms and is a junction on the – main line with branch line towards Mettupalayam.

See also

Railway stations in Coimbatore
Salem railway division
Coimbatore
Indian Railways
Transport in Coimbatore

References

External links
 The official website of Southern railway

Railway junction stations in Tamil Nadu
Railway stations in Coimbatore
Salem railway division